Shu Thayu? is a 2018 Indian Gujarati language comedy film written and directed by Krishnadev Yagnik and produced by Mahesh Danannavar, the founder of MD Media Corp & Vaishal Shah. It stars Malhar Thakar, Yash Soni, Mayur Chauhan, Mitra Gadhavi, Aarjav Trivedi and Kinjal Rajpriya. The score was composed by the Kedar-Bhargav and Rahul Munjariya. The film is a remake of the Tamil film Naduvula Konjam Pakkatha Kaanom (2012).

Cast 
 Malhar Thakar as Manan
 Yash Soni as Neel
 Mitra Gadhavi as Chirag
 Aarjav Trivedi as Viral
 Kinjal Rajpriya as Deepali
 Netri Trivedi as Chaitali
 Mayur Chauhan as Barber
 Rahul Rawal as Chaitali's Husband
 Jay Bhatt as Doctor
 Prashant Barot as Deepali's Father

Production 
The film was shot over 32 days in 28 different locations.

Release 
The film was released on 24 August 2018 in 212 different locations.

Reception

Critical reception 
The Times of India rated the movie 3.5 out of 5 stars and said, "The movie retains its fun factor so well that it is a must-watch for all Malhar Thakar fans. Go, watch this Chhello Divas cast recreate the magic in a totally different story!"

Box office 
The film earned ₹5.11 crores on its first weekend. In 11 days, the film earned ₹15.46 crores to become one of the highest earning Gujarati films of all time. The film earned total ₹21 crores in its theatrical run.

References

External links 

2018 films
Indian comedy films
Films shot in India
Films set in Ahmedabad
Films shot in Ahmedabad
Films shot in Gujarat
Gujarati remakes of Tamil films
Films directed by Krishnadev Yagnik
2010s Gujarati-language films
2018 comedy films